Francesca Ruth Fisher-Eastwood (born August 7, 1993) is an American television personality, socialite and actress. She starred with her family in Mrs. Eastwood & Company, a reality series broadcast on E!. She is also known for her appearances in TV series like Heroes Reborn, Fargo, and Twin Peaks: The Return, and films like Jersey Boys and Old.

Early life 
Eastwood was born in Redding, California, to actress Frances Fisher and actor and director Clint Eastwood. Through her father, she has seven half-siblings: sisters Kimber Tunis, Alison Eastwood, Kathryn Reeves, Laurie Murray, and Morgan; and brothers Kyle Eastwood and Scott Eastwood. Her mother is of Ashkenazi Jewish and Norwegian descent.

She attended Stevenson School in Pebble Beach, California.

Career 
Eastwood first appeared on the reality television series Mrs. Eastwood & Company when it premiered on May 20, 2012. It focused on her life, and those of her stepmother Dina Eastwood, and her half-sister Morgan Eastwood. During an early episode, she and photographer Tyler Shields, her boyfriend at the time, were filmed burning and destroying a $100,000 Hermès Birkin bag during a photo shoot. When this brought them both death threats and other negative attention, Shields said "People spend $200,000 on an album cover, they spend millions on catering for movies, they spend money to create things--that is all I am doing with this."

Eastwood was Miss Golden Globe for 2013.

In 2017, she and her mother Frances Fisher both starred in the acclaimed Fargo episode "The Law of Non-Contradiction" as the young and old versions of the same character.

Personal life 
In 2013, Eastwood was living in Los Angeles and attending the University of Southern California.

On November 17, 2013, Eastwood married 35-year-old Jordan Feldstein, actor Jonah Hill's brother and the manager of Maroon 5, in a small ceremony in Las Vegas. Eight days later, on November 25, Eastwood filed for an annulment of the marriage. Feldstein died in December 2017, when a blood clot from his leg travelled to his lungs.

Eastwood was previously in a relationship with Alexander Wraith, a trainer and actor. The two have a son together, Titan Wraith Eastwood.

Filmography

References

External links 
 
 
 
 

1993 births
Living people
21st-century American actresses
Actresses from California
American child actresses
American film actresses
American people of Hungarian-Jewish descent
American people of Russian-Jewish descent
American television actresses
Eastwood family
People from Redding, California
University of Southern California alumni
People from Pebble Beach, California
Clint Eastwood